Snowidza  (German: Hertwigswaldau) is a village in the administrative district of Gmina Mściwojów, within Jawor County, Lower Silesian Voivodeship, in south-western Poland.

References

Snowidza